Hansraj was an Indian politician from the state of the Madhya Pradesh. He represented Bijawar Vidhan Sabha constituency of undivided Madhya Pradesh Legislative Assembly by winning the 1957 Madhya Pradesh Legislative Assembly election.

References 

Year of birth missing
Possibly living people
Madhya Pradesh MLAs 1957–1962
People from Chhatarpur district
Indian National Congress politicians from Madhya Pradesh